Just Energy Group Inc. (formerly Just Energy Income Fund and before that Energy Savings Income Fund) is a Canadian-based natural gas and electricity retailer operating in Canadian and American markets across North America.

Operations
Just Energy is a publicly traded company (TSX:JE, NYSE:JE) and serves 4.5 million customers collectively under its affiliate companies Just Energy, Hudson Energy, Commerce Energy, Tara Energy, Amigo Energy, Momentis and Hudson Energy Solar. The company was listed and began trading on the New York Stock Exchange on January 30, 2012 (NYSE:JE) and celebrated its 20-year anniversary in the energy industry in May 2017.

Just Energy entered the United Kingdom commercial energy market in July 2012 under its Hudson Energy UK brand. In October 2013, the company expanded into the UK residential market under the Green Star Energy brand, but in October 2019 it agreed to sell Green Star's customers (around 200,000 in number) to Shell Energy. In 2016, Just Energy further expanded with operations in Germany, followed by Ireland in 2017.

Just Energy's business involves the sale of natural gas and/or electricity supply to residential and commercial customers under long term fixed price, price-protected or variable-priced contracts and green energy products. The company derives its margin or gross profit from the difference between the price at which it is able to sell the commodities to its customers and the related price at which it purchases the associated volumes from its suppliers.

Markets
Just Energy supplies natural gas and/or electricity in Alberta, British Columbia, Manitoba, Ontario, Quebec, and Saskatchewan in Canada; California, Delaware, Georgia, Illinois, Indiana, Maryland, Massachusetts, Michigan, New Jersey, New York, Ohio, Pennsylvania, and Texas in the United States; and in Germany, Ireland and Japan.

The Just Energy Group's portfolio includes Amigo Energy and Tara Energy, which both serve the Texas market; and TerraPass, a California-based carbon offsetting business.

Name change
In 2009, the company undertook a rebranding campaign from Energy Savings Income Fund and U.S. Energy Savings, Ontario Energy Savings, Alberta Energy Savings to Just Energy Income Fund across all of its Canadian and U.S. markets. The company incorporated in 2011 and was renamed Just Energy Group.

Acquisitions
In April 2010, the company expanded its marketing distribution channel and launched a new network marketing arm under the brand, Momentis. The company completed the acquisition of Toronto-based direct energy marketer Universal Energy Corporation on July 1, 2009. From that acquisition, Just Energy gained National Home Services. In May 2010, Just Energy acquired Hudson Energy Group, an energy marketer in the U.S. commercial sector. In August 2011, Just Energy announced a deal to acquire Fulcrum Retail Holdings LLC, a privately held electricity provider operating in Texas.

Controversies
Former Enron executives James Lewis and Deborah Merril were Just Energy's senior executive, president, and Co-CEOs since 2007.

San Francisco's KPIX-TV news reported in June 2013 that there had been tens of thousands of complaints across the U.S. from consumers saying they were misled into signing up with Just Energy, and instead of saving money on their monthly bills as advertised, the cost went up. The complaints led to a consumer fraud lawsuit filed by the state of Illinois, and investigations in New York, Ohio, and Canada. Just Energy settled each of these cases, paying large fines and promising to change its sales practices.

In June 2003, the Toronto Star reported that both Direct Energy and the Ontario Energy Savings Corp., a subsidiary of the Energy Savings Income Fund, had been charged with fraud as a result of its agents having forged energy contracts, and had been fined. In 2010, three former Just Energy salespeople were charged in Alberta, Canada with having forged customer signatures on fraudulent energy contracts. The three defendants pleaded guilty and were fined a total of $6,800.

In July 2008, the Attorney General of New York state brought action against U.S. Energy Savings (now Just Energy) for deceptive sales practices. The company was obliged to pay $200,000 in penalties and costs to the state.

"U.S. Energy Savings (now Just Energy) is purposely deceiving consumers", Attorney General Madigan said. "Many of these families signed up for this program based on the false claim that they would save on their monthly utility bills. Instead, U.S. Energy locked them into a contract that actually charged them more for natural gas."

In response to criticism, Just Energy's CEO Ken Hartwick said in an interview with Report on Business magazine in 2013 that Just Energy dropped the savings claim years ago. Hartwick claims the company has taken steps to ensure that consumers know that they are purchasing what equates to an insurance product. He further claims all sales are followed up with a verification phone call by a third party to mitigate against any aggressive sales tactics. However, Just Energy salespeople are still making claims of savings, despite the vast majority of customers paying more. Since Hartwick's claim, Just Energy has been cited by the Ontario Energy Board in November 2013 and November 2014, and by the Attorney General of Massachusetts in January 2015, for continued infractions, including widespread deceptive sales practices. Hartwick left the company in 2014. James Lewis and Deborah Merril, who helped to found the company in 2002, are now joint CEOs.

Rebecca MacDonald, Just Energy's executive chair, has been accused of falsifying her credentials and her biography. Additionally, forensic accounting firms have determined that Just Energy uses questionable accounting practices and has misled investors as to their financial condition.

In September 2014, the police department of Sudbury, Ontario, issued a warning to the city's residents regarding the aggressive and illegal door-to-door sales activities of Just Energy sales representatives, and advised contacting the police if salespeople refuse to leave when requested.

In November 2014, the Canadian Federal Competition Bureau says a subsidiary (National Energy Corp, which operates as National Home Services) of Just Energy Group Inc. has agreed to pay $7 million in penalties, restitution and other costs related to complaints over its door-to-door water heater marketing practices in Ontario and Quebec. Finding by the bureau that sales staff were misleading customers about their identity and the purpose of their visits.

In January 2015, the Attorney General's Office of Massachusetts announced that Just Energy had agreed to pay $4 million to settle allegations of deceptive marketing and overcharging consumers. According to the settlement, Just Energy charged rates that were higher than the rates for the electricity supply provided by NSTAR and National Grid, and induced elderly and non-native English speakers by continuing to offer electricity supply services even after it became clear that they did not understand the terms of the contract. Consumers were also switched to Just Energy without authorization, and termination fees worth tens of thousands of dollars were charged to small business owners who weren't advised of the charges.

May 2015, a class action against the Just Energy group of companies claimed it unlawfully withheld the minimum protection of the Employment Standards Act from its door-to-door sales agents.

March 2021, Just Energy is being investigated into possible securities fraud. NYSE Regulation had proceeded to delist its shares from the NYSE as Just Energy is proceeding to go under Chapter 15 of the Bankruptcy Code in the US.

Bankruptcy

In March 2021, after the Texas power crisis caused crushing losses, the company sought court protection and bankruptcy.

The Ontario Superior Court of Justice has extended the stay period under the Companies’ Creditors Arrangement Act multiple times allowing the company to continue to operate in the ordinary course of business, while pursuing a restructuring plan with its stakeholders.

On June 16, 2021, Texas Governor Greg Abbott signed House Bill 4492, which provides a mechanism for recovery of certain costs incurred by various parties, including Just Energy, during the extreme weather event in Texas in February 2021 through certain securitization structures.

References

External links
 

Companies formerly listed on the New York Stock Exchange
Companies that filed for Chapter 11 bankruptcy in 2021
Companies listed on the TSX Venture Exchange
Consumer fraud
Electric power companies of Canada
Fraud in Canada
Fraud in the United States